Me First is a 1964 Argentine drama film directed by Fernando Ayala, and written by Héctor Olivera and Luis Pico Estrada. It was entered into the 1964 Cannes Film Festival.

Cast 
Alberto de Mendoza		
Ricardo Areco
Eduardo Bergara Leumann (cameo)
Cristina Berys
Augusto Bonardo
Horacio Casals
Mirtha Dabner
Susana Freyre		
Héctor Gance
Mario Lozano
Duilio Marzio		
Carlos Muñoz		
Esteban Nesich
Marilina Ross		
Marcelo Simonetti
Mercedes Sombra
Juan Manuel Tenuta		
María Vaner
Soledad Vertiz

References

External links 

1964 films
1960s Spanish-language films
1964 drama films
Argentine black-and-white films
Films directed by Fernando Ayala
Argentine drama films
1960s Argentine films